The Rookie is a 2002 American sports drama film directed by John Lee Hancock and produced by Walt Disney Pictures. It is based on the true story of Jim Morris who debuted in Major League Baseball at age 35. The film stars Dennis Quaid as Morris, alongside Rachel Griffiths, Jay Hernandez, Angus T. Jones, and Brian Cox.

Plot
Jim Morris is the son of a career Navy man, who moves the family from Hollywood, Florida to Big Lake, Texas, in order to maintain job security. Jim is shown to be a skilled pitcher, though his father disapproves of Jim's dream of making it to Major League Baseball. It is later mentioned that the town to which Jim's family moved, Big Lake, has lost its love for baseball, preferring football instead. Thus, he was unable to play baseball in high school. He later gets a chance when he is drafted by the Milwaukee Brewers, but he tears up his shoulder, ending his hopes of achieving his lifelong dream.

In 1999, Jim, married with three children, is a high school science teacher, as well as head baseball coach. His team, the Big Lake Owls, is unsuccessful, with many of his players being skilled but unmotivated, especially with little community support. One day after practice, the team catcher offers to play catch with Jim. There, it is revealed that Jim may still have his fastball, and it is soon displayed to the rest of the team. The Owls believe that Jim could possibly pitch in the major leagues and offer him a deal: if the Owls can win district and make the state playoffs, Jim will try out again. He accepts their offer and, furthermore, the team urges him to throw his fastball in batting practice; this immensely improves their batting skills.

The Owls end up winning district. Jim is told of a tryout nearby for the Tampa Bay Devil Rays, and Jim goes without telling his wife Lorri, afraid that her fear of him re-injuring his shoulder would keep him from going. The lead scout tells Jim that he could be signed to a minor-league deal. Lorri finds out after getting two phone messages from the Tampa Bay scouts. Jim tells his father - with whom he still has a cold relationship - of his situation, and his father once again tries to dissuade Jim. Lorri is also reluctant to let Jim go, citing his home responsibilities, but after seeing how Jim is inspiring their son, Hunter, she allows him to go.

Jim is initially assigned to the minor league Class AA Orlando Rays, but quickly moves up to the Class AAA Durham Bulls. Concerned for his family due to mounting bills (the pay in the minor leagues being low), Jim decides to give it up and come home, but Lorri talks him out of it, not wanting Jim to give up again. Jim gets inspired again when he unexpectedly views his own interview on a television in and then watches a Little League Baseball game the same night, remembering the same love for baseball he had as a kid.

In September, Jim is told that the Major League club has called him up, and that they will be playing in Texas against the Rangers. Jim calls his family, who in turn informs the town. Advising his wife of the dress code in the majors, Jim finds his sports coat, a necktie, and his St. Rita necklace hanging in his locker (St. Rita is the saint of impossible dreams). His family, high school players, and many townspeople go to the game. Jim impresses many of the coaches in warm-ups with his fastball, and late in the game, with Tampa Bay losing badly, Jim is called into the game to pitch to Royce Clayton and end the inning. Jim gets a strikeout against Clayton on three straight fastballs. After the game, Jim gets interviewed by the press; during this interview, Jim notices his father had also come to the game. Jim's father admits how special it is to be able to see his son play in the majors, and apologizes for not supporting Jim before. Jim thanks him and gives him the ball with which he had gotten the strikeout, and the two repair their relationship. Jim then meets with his family and all the townspeople who had come to the game, applauding Jim on his amazing success story.

The Big Lake high school trophy case displays Jim's major league jersey. It is then mentioned that Jim would go on to pitch in the major leagues for two seasons before retiring and returning to teaching in Texas.

Cast
 Dennis Quaid as Jim Morris
 Rachel Griffiths as Lorri Morris
 Jay Hernandez as Joaquin 'Wack' Campos
 Beth Grant as Olline
 Angus T. Jones as Hunter Morris
 Brian Cox as Jim Morris Sr.
 Rick Gonzalez as Rudy Bonilla (Owls pitcher)
 Chad Lindberg as Joe David Werst
 Angelo Spizzirri as Joel De La Garza (Owls catcher)
 Matt Williams as Owls Player #1
 Royce D. Applegate as Henry
 Russell Richardson as Brooks
 Raynor Scheine as Frank
 David Blackwell as Cal
 Chris Sheffield as Snow Covered Catcher
 Blue Deckert as Baseball Scout Dave Patterson
 Danny Kamin as Durham Manager Mac (as Daniel Kamin)
 Mike Smith as Fan
 Kyle Christensen as Baseball Player
 Robbie Bigelow as Beefcake Bigelow
 Jim Morris as Orlando Umpire #2
 Trevor Morgan as young Jimmy (uncredited)

Reception
Review aggregation site Rotten Tomatoes reports an approval rating of 84% based on 154 reviews, with an average rating of 7.2/10. The critics consensus reads, "A heart-warming sports flick, The Rookie greatly benefits from understated direction and the emotional honesty Dennis Quaid brings to the role of Jim Morris." On Metacritic, the film has a weighted average score 72 out of 100 based on 31 critics, indicating "generally favorable reviews". Audiences polled by CinemaScore gave the film an average grade of "A" on an A+ to F scale.

The film was recognized by American Film Institute in 2006 on its 100 Years...100 Cheers.

Filming locations
The Rookie was filmed almost entirely in North and Central Texas. Apart from scenes filmed at The Ballpark in Arlington, locations included the following:

The city of Thorndale, Texas, was used predominantly in the opening half of the film as the small town of Big Lake. Thorndale High School's interior, exterior parts of the building and baseball field were used for Big Lake High School's campus. Thorndale's Main Street and downtown area was also used extensively in the film.
Neighboring Thrall High School in Thrall, Texas, was dressed for several differing scenes, including scenes of several different "away" baseball games filmed on the school's field. Thrall's then-recently completed football stadium stood in as Big Lake's. Thrall's old football field, dressing rooms and recreation pavilion were dressed as an oil refinery's outlay in a deleted scene viewable on the DVD's special features.
A scene shot in front of a motel supposedly in Florida was actually filmed in front of what is now a Best Western in Taylor, Texas.

Most of the population portrayed in this movie of Big Lake, Texas were fictional. Only the baseball team and those directly connected were based on real people.

The Bulls game was shot in Round Rock, Texas at the Dell Diamond.

The tryout scenes were filmed at Taylor High School in Taylor, Texas.

The Orlando Rays game was shot at Austin ISD's Nelson Field.

The oilfield scene was shot on the Heep Ranch south of Austin.

References

External links
 

2002 films
2002 biographical drama films
2002 drama films
2000s sports drama films
American baseball films
American biographical drama films
American sports drama films
American children's drama films
Biographical films about sportspeople
Biographical films about educators
Cultural depictions of baseball players
Cultural depictions of American men
Films scored by Carter Burwell
Films directed by John Lee Hancock
Films set in Texas
Films shot in Texas
Films set in 1999
Sports films based on actual events
Tampa Bay Rays
Texas Rangers (baseball)
Films set in Connecticut
Films set in Virginia
Films set in Florida
Walt Disney Pictures films
2000s English-language films
2000s American films
Films about Major League Baseball